The Greatest Gift is a posthumously-released compilation album by the American noise rock band Scratch Acid. It contains all of the material they released throughout their career, in chronological order of release.

Track listing
Tracks 1-8: Scratch Acid
Tracks 9-21: Just Keep Eating
Tracks 22-27: Berserker

"Cannibal" – 2:24
"Greatest Gift" – 2:11
"Monsters" – 1:19
"Owner's Lament" – 4:39
"She Said" – 2:27
"Mess" – 2:22
"El Espectro" – 3:39
"Lay Screaming" – 2:47
"Crazy Dan" – 4:13
"Eyeball" – 2:06
"Big Bone Lick" – 3:48
"Unlike a Baptist" – 2:31
"Damned for All Time" – 2:05
"Ain't That Love" – 2:23
 (untitled) – 0:29
"Holes" – 2:00
"Albino Slug" – 3:26
"Spit a Kiss" – 2:02
"Amicus" – 3:15
"Cheese Plug" – 2:45
 (untitled) – 2:20
"Mary Had a Little Drug Problem" – 2:16
"For Crying out Loud" – 3:06
"Moron's Moron" – 3:13
"Skin Drips" – 2:42
"This Is Bliss" – 2:16
"Flying Houses" – 3:08
"The Scale Song" – 3:04

Personnel
Brett Bradford  – guitar
David Wm. Sims – bass guitar
Rey Washam – drums
David Yow – vocals

References

1991 compilation albums
Scratch Acid albums
Touch and Go Records compilation albums